Ivan, Viscount d'Oyley, born Alastair Ivan Ladislaus Lucidus Evans, (2 February 1880 – 22 May 1904) was an American who competed for France at the Olympics in fencing. He competed in the individual épée event at the 1900 Summer Olympics. His father, Dr. d'Oyley-Evans, a Paris-based American dentist, bought the title of Marquis from the Pope, later acquiring the titles of Count and Viscount for his sons. Viscount d'Oyley killed himself from a self-inflicted gunshot.

References

External links
 

1880 births
1904 suicides
American male épée fencers
French male épée fencers
Olympic fencers of France
Fencers at the 1900 Summer Olympics
Viscounts
Suicides by firearm in France